Gary Kent (born June 7, 1933) is an American film director, actor, and stuntperson notable for his appearances in various independent, grindhouse and exploitation films. A native of Washington, Kent studied at the University of Washington before later embarking on a film career. He made his feature film debut in Battle Flame (1959), and had roles in several other low-budget films in the 1960s, including The Black Klansman (1966) and the biker film The Savage Seven (1968). He also served as a stunt double for Bruce Dern in Psych-Out (1969).

Kent and his experiences as a stuntman served as inspiration for Cliff Booth, the character portrayed by Brad Pitt in Quentin Tarantino's Once Upon a Time in Hollywood (2019).

Biography

Early life
Kent was born on a wheat ranch in Walla Walla, Washington, the son of Arthur E. and Iola Kent. He graduated from Renton High School in Renton, Washington, a suburb of Seattle, and attended the University of Washington, where he studied journalism, played football and pole-vaulted on the track team. After college he entered the Naval Air Corps, where he wrote promotion and publicity for the Navy's elite flying team, The Blue Angels.

Career
In 1959 Kent moved to Hollywood and was working primarily in drive-in exploitation films. He acted, worked stunts and directed action for directors Richard Rush, Monte Hellman, Al Adamson, Don Jones, Ray Dennis Steckler, Peter Bogdanovich and Brian De Palma. He performed television stunts and acted on Green Hornet, The Man from U.N.C.L.E., and NBC's Daniel Boone starring Fess Parker. Some of the films he directed were The Pyramid (1975) and Rainy Day Friends (1983). Kent doubled Jack Nicholson in stunts in the Richard Rush films Hells Angels on Wheels, The Savage Seven and Psych-Out, and also did his very first stunts in 1966 Nicholson films Ride in the Whirlwind and The Shooting, which shot back to back in Kanab, Utah under the direction of Monte Hellman.

In his 2009 memoir Shadows and Light, Kent writes of an "outlaw" cinema aimed at breaking film taboos and barriers. In the book he talks of shooting at Spahn Ranch when Charles Manson and his followers were there. He retired from stunts in 2003 after an accident on Don Coscarelli's film Bubba Ho-Tep, for which Kent served as stunt coordinator. Kent does continue to act in independent films.

Later years
As of 2018, Kent resided in Austin, Texas. Kent is the subject of the documentary Danger God released on DVD in 2019. Kent and his career as a stuntman in Hollywood (specifically his experience working at Spahn Ranch while the Manson family resided there) served as inspiration for the character of Cliff Booth (played by Brad Pitt) in Quentin Tarantino's Once Upon a Time in Hollywood (2019).

Filmography

References

External links

Living people
1933 births
American stunt performers
American male actors
Film directors from Washington (state)
People from Walla Walla, Washington
Male actors from Seattle
University of Washington alumni